Myodocopina is a suborder of ostracods.

References

Myodocopida
Arthropod suborders